A Caesar salad (also spelled Cesar and Cesare) is a green salad of romaine lettuce and croutons dressed with lemon juice (or lime juice), olive oil, egg, Worcestershire sauce, anchovies, garlic, Dijon mustard, Parmesan cheese, and black pepper.

In its original form, this salad was prepared and served tableside.

History 

The salad's creation is generally attributed to the restaurateur Caesar Cardini, an Italian immigrant who operated restaurants in Mexico and the United States. Cardini lived in San Diego but ran one of his restaurants in Tijuana to attract American customers seeking to circumvent the restrictions of Prohibition. His daughter, Rosa, recounted that her father invented the salad at the Tijuana restaurant when a Fourth of July rush in 1924 depleted the kitchen's supplies. Cardini made do with what he had, adding the dramatic flair of table-side tossing by the chef.  Some recountings of the history state that Alex Cardini, Caesar Cardini's brother, made the salad, and that the salad was previously named the "Aviator Salad" because it was made for aviators who traveled over during Prohibition. A number of Cardini's staff have also said that they invented the dish.

Julia Child said that she had eaten a Caesar salad at Cardini's restaurant when she was a child in the 1920s. In 1946, the newspaper columnist Dorothy Kilgallen wrote of a Caesar containing anchovies, differing from Cardini's version:

The big food rage in Hollywood—the Caesar salad—will be introduced to New Yorkers by Gilmore's Steak House. It's an intricate  concoction that takes ages to prepare and contains (zowie!)  lots of garlic, raw or slightly coddled eggs, croutons, romaine,  anchovies, parmeasan [sic] cheese, olive oil, vinegar and plenty of black pepper.

In a 1952 interview, Cardini said the salad became well known, in 1937, when Manny Wolf, story editor and Paramount Pictures writer's department head, provided the recipe to Hollywood restaurants.

In the 1970s, Cardini's daughter said that the original recipe included whole lettuce leaves, which were meant to be lifted by the stem and eaten with the fingers; coddled eggs; and garlic infused olive oil. Everyone makes the dressing a little differently and anchovy paste is sometimes added with Worcestershire sauce, dry mustard and garlic to enhance the flavor of the olive oil. Several sources have testified that the original recipe used only Worcestershire sauce without any anchovies, which Cardini considered too bold in flavor.

Although the original recipe does not contain anchovies, modern recipes typically include anchovies as a key ingredient, which frequently is emulsified in bottled versions. Bottled Caesar dressings are now produced and marketed by many companies.

The trademark brands, "Cardini's", "Caesar Cardini's" and "The Original Caesar Dressing" are all claimed to date to February 1950, although they were only registered decades later, and more than a dozen varieties of bottled Cardini's dressing are available today, with various ingredients.

As the salad moved North to the U.S, a key ingredient changed within the recipe. Lemon juice is commonly used, despite the original Caesar salad opting for lime.

Common ingredients 

Common ingredients in many recipes:
 romaine or cos lettuce
 olive oil
 crushed garlic
 salt
 Dijon mustard
 black pepper
 lemon juice
 Worcestershire sauce
 anchovies
 raw or coddled eggs
 grated Parmesan cheese
 croutons

Variations include varying the leaf, adding meat such as grilled chicken or bacon, or omitting ingredients such as anchovies and eggs.

Vegan versions can replace anchovies with capers and the eggs with tahini.

Health concerns 

There is inherent risk of infection by salmonella bacteria occasionally found in raw egg from cracked or improperly handled eggshells where the protective cuticle is damaged. Updated recipes recommend eggs that are briefly heated to 160 degrees or pasteurized eggs. Some variations of the dressing may use other substitutions for egg.

See also 

 List of salads

Citations

General and cited references

Further reading

External links 
 History of salads

 
1924 in Mexico
American salads
California culture
Cuisine of the Western United States
Mexican cuisine
Salad dressings
Vegetable dishes